The Francis Mond Professor of Aeronautical Engineering is a professorship in the University of Cambridge. It was established in 1919 as a result of a benefaction from Emile Mond, in memory of his son Francis who had been educated at Peterhouse and was killed in action on 15 May 1918 whilst serving with the RAF on the Western Front.

Incumbents of the Francis Mond Professorship of Aeronautical Engineering

Bennett Melvill Jones, 1919–1952
William Austyn Mair, 1952–1983
Michael Gaster, 1986–1995
Bill Dawes, 1996–current

See also
List of Professorships at the University of Cambridge

References

Aeronautical Engineering, Mond, Francis
School of Technology, University of Cambridge
Aeronautical Engineering, Mond, Francis, Cambridge
1919 establishments in England